Petersianthus quadrialatus (also called toog and Philippine rosewood) is an emergent tropical rainforest tree species in the Lecythidaceae family. In the Visayas region called kapullan, in the Samar and Leyte areas - magtalisai. It is an indigenous tree species in the southeastern Philippines and one of the largest tree species in the Philippines islands.

Taxonomy
Petersianthus by the original author.

Description

Morphology
The leaves are simple, spirally arranged, obovate, 10–16 cm long and 5–8 cm wide. The base is acutely acuminate, long cuneate, apex rounded caudate. Glossy and dark green, the petioles are short with short soft hairs. Fruits are in capsule form in flat circular outline containing four large winged seeds.

Growth and size
Natural regeneration is very scarce. Seedlings can be found as far as 200 m from mother trees, especially between buttresses. Height increment in a 2-year-old plantation was 0.7 – 2.9 m and diameter increment is 0.6 – 3.8 cm. Petersianthus quadrialatus trees coppice easily.

A deciduous, medium to very large rainforest tree species that grows up to 40–60 m tall and 80-100 (occasionally -250-370) cm in diameter at breast height. The trunk is straight, cylindrical, branchless with a length of 20–30 m. Buttress is occasionally up to 2 m high.

Largest tree
Currently known tallest Petersianthus quadrialatus growing near national highway, in the outskirts of San Francisco town, Alegria municipality in the northeastern part of Mindanao island. The tree is  meters high,  in diameter, and estimated to be ~ 300 years old.

Distribution
Petersianthus quadrialatus endemic to the part of the southeastern Philippines - Mindanao,  Panay, Leyte, Samar, Negros, Masbate and surrounding smaller islands.

Habitat
Petersianthus quadrialatus grows in an elevation that ranges from sea level up to about 400 meters. Tree is fairly common and grows scattered in primary and secondary tropical rainforest, near riverbanks or on hillside, in swampy and cool places. It thrives in an area where rainfall is evenly distributed throughout the year. It requires well-drained, clayish, sandy and loamy soils.

Uses
Leaves are medicinal especially in treating skin rashes. Seeds are edible and taste like groundnut. Because its wood is hard and difficult to cut and is as strong as molave (Vitex parviflora), its highly preferred for heavy construction such as bridges, beams, joists, poles, wood piles of wharves and piers, veneer, and plywood, also for door faces and door components like jambs, stops and casing.

Habitat destruction
Considered a disappearing tree due to logging and kaingin-making.

See also
 List of superlative trees

References

Bibliography

External links
 Tulig, M.; R. Govaerts; S. Mori (2021). World Checklist of Lecythidaceae. Facilitated by the Royal Botanic Gardens, Kew. Published on the Internet; https://wcsp.science.kew.org/namedetail.do?name_id=313235 Retrieved 19 April 2021
 phytoimages.siu.edu / Petersianthus quadrialatus
 philippineflora.wordpress.com / philippineflora.wordpress.com / Philippine Rosewood (Toog Tree)
 pbase.com / MAJESTIC TOOG: PHILIPPINE’S TALLEST LIVING CHRISTMAS TREE
 gmanetwork.com / gmanetwork.com / Manobos decorate RP’s tallest tree for Christmas, October 16, 2010
 pinoytrees.blogspot.co.uk / pinoytrees.blogspot.co.uk / The Towering Toog Trees
 vimeo.com / MAJESTIC TOOG: PHILIPPINE’S TALLEST LIVING CHRISTMAS TREE

Lecythidaceae
Endemic flora of the Philippines
Taxa named by Elmer Drew Merrill